Colonel Francis Venables-Vernon-Harcourt (6 January 1801 – 23 April 1880) was a British Conservative Party politician and courtier.

Background
Venables-Vernon-Harcourt was the ninth son of the Most Reverend Edward Venables-Vernon-Harcourt, Archbishop of York, who in turn was the third son of George Venables-Vernon, 1st Baron Vernon. His mother was Lady Anne, daughter of Granville Leveson-Gower, 1st Marquess of Stafford. William Vernon Harcourt, Granville Harcourt-Vernon and Octavius Vernon Harcourt were his brothers.

Career
He served as an equerry to Queen Victoria's mother, the Duchess of Kent.

Venables-Vernon-Harcourt was elected at the 1852 general election as the Member of Parliament (MP) for the Isle of Wight, but did not stand again at the 1857 general election.

Family
Venables-Vernon-Harcourt married Lady Catherine Julia, daughter of Charles Jenkinson, 3rd Earl of Liverpool, in 1837. She died in December 1877, aged 66. Venables-Vernon-Harcourt survived her by three years and died in April 1880, aged 79.

References

Sources

External links 
 

1801 births
1880 deaths
Conservative Party (UK) MPs for English constituencies
UK MPs 1852–1857
Members of Parliament for the Isle of Wight